The Boston refers to various step dances, considered a slow Americanized version of the waltz presumably named after where it originated. It is completed in one measure with the weight kept on the same foot through two successive beats. The "original" Boston is also known as the New York Boston or Boston Point.

Variations of the Boston include: 
 The Long Boston also known as the Philadelphia Boston, the Walking Boston or the One Step Waltz.
 The One-Step.
 The Short Boston,.
 The Dip Boston.
 The Spanish Boston
 The French Boston
 The Herring Bone Boston
 The English Boston or Three-Step Boston.
 The Four-Step Boston or Four-Step Waltz.
 The Five-Step Boston or Five-Step Waltz.
 The Seven-Step Boston.
 The Double Boston or Cross Boston or Count of Luxembourg Staircase Valse
 The Triple Boston
 The Triple Double Boston
 The Russian Boston

References 

Dance in the United States
Partner dance